Halbwachs is a German surname. Notable people with the surname include:

 Wilhelm Hallwachs (1859–1922), German physicist
 Hans Peter Hallwachs (1938–2022), German television actor

See also
 Halbwachs

German-language surnames